Kimi is a 2022 American thriller film directed by Steven Soderbergh and written and produced by David Koepp. The film stars Zoë Kravitz. It was released on HBO Max on February 10, 2022, to generally positive reviews.

Plot
Bradley Hasling, CEO of a tech corporation called Amygdala, gives an interview about the company's newest product, Kimi. Kimi is a smart speaker which controversially makes use of human monitoring to improve the device's search algorithm. Amygdala plans to soon hold an initial public offering, which stands to earn Hasling a fortune.

Angela Childs is an employee of Amygdala in Seattle who works from home monitoring incoming data streams from Kimi devices and making corrections to the software. She suffers from anxiety and agoraphobia due to a previous assault, which has been exacerbated by the COVID-19 pandemic. Her primary human contact is with her romantic partner Terry, her neighbor from across the street whom she meets for sex in her apartment. One day while working, Angela receives a recording that appears to capture a violent sexual assault by a man named Brad. With the help of her coworker Darius, she accesses the information of the account holder, a woman named Samantha. Angela uncovers more of Samantha's recording, including one that sounds like her murder. It is revealed that "Brad" is in fact Bradley Hasling himself and that Samantha was his mistress. Bradley had ordered the murder from a hitman named Rivas. Angela transfers the recordings to a flash drive.

She reports the incident to her superior, who refers her to Natalie Chowdhury, an executive at Amygdala. Angela attempts to reach Chowdhury over the phone multiple times, but is eventually convinced to come to her office in person, with the promise that the FBI will be informed about the case. At the office, Angela is disturbed when Chowdhury seems reluctant to contact the authorities and makes reference to Angela's prior mental health leave. While waiting for the FBI to be contacted, she receives word from Darius that someone has deleted Samantha's voice recordings from the Amygdala servers and shortly after sees two unknown men enter the office. She flees and travels on foot towards the nearby FBI field office, while being tracked by Rivas and his accomplices through her cell phone.

The men catch up with Angela and attempt to force her into a van, but a group of nearby protestors prevent her from being abducted. However, one of Rivas's men, a hacker named Yuri, is able to deduce where she is headed from her search history. Angela is drugged and taken back to her apartment by her kidnappers, who plan to stage a home invasion to cover up her murder. On their way inside, they are interrupted by Kevin, a neighbor who also spends all of his time inside and became concerned after seeing Angela leave the house. Kevin is stabbed, distracting the assailants, but Rivas is already waiting inside her apartment. He confiscates the flash drive and begins to delete the recordings from Angela's laptop, but she uses her Kimi device to again distract Rivas and his men, escaping to a higher floor. She cobbles together a weapon using a nail gun left by a construction project in the apartment above her, using it to kill the intruders. Terry, whom she had planned to meet up with, arrives just as she is calling 9-1-1.

An epilogue shows that Bradley Hasling has been arrested for Samantha's murder. Angela, sporting a new hairstyle, gets breakfast with Terry outside of her apartment.

Cast

 Zoë Kravitz as Angela Childs
 Byron Bowers as Terry Hughes
 Jaime Camil as Antonio Rivas
 Erika Christensen as Samantha Gerrity
 Derek DelGaudio as Bradley Hasling
 Robin Givens as Angela’s Mother
 India de Beaufort as Sharon
 Charles Halford as Tall Thug
 Devin Ratray as Kevin
 Jacob Vargas as Glasses Thug
 Rita Wilson as Natalie Chowdhury
 Betsy Brantley as Kimi (voice)
 Alex Dobrenko as Darius Popescu
 David Wain as Angela’s Dentist
 Andy Daly as Christian Holloway
 Emily Kuroda as Dr. Sarah Burns

Production
On February 25, 2021, it was announced that Steven Soderbergh would direct the New Line Cinema feature Kimi with Zoë Kravitz on board to star. In March 2021, Byron Bowers, Jaime Camil, Jacob Vargas and Derek DelGaudio joined the cast. In April 2021, Erika Christensen and Devin Ratray joined the cast. Principal photography began in April 2021 in Los Angeles, where the majority of interior scenes were filmed. In May, the production moved to Seattle to film exterior scenes.

Release
Kimi was released on HBO Max on February 10, 2022. The film was released on DVD and digital on April 12, 2022.

Reception

Notes

References

External links
 
 

2022 films
2022 thriller films
2020s English-language films
Agoraphobia in fiction
American thriller films
Films about the COVID-19 pandemic
Films directed by Steven Soderbergh
Films produced by David Koepp
Films scored by Cliff Martinez
Films set in apartment buildings
Films set in Seattle
Films shot in Los Angeles
Films shot in Seattle
Films with screenplays by David Koepp
HBO Max films
New Line Cinema films
Warner Bros. films
2020s American films